Alias is a 2013 Canadian documentary film directed by Michelle Latimer, in her feature film directorial debut.

Premise 
The film "follows aspiring rappers trying to escape the gangster life." The Hot Docs Film Festival synopsis reads: "Michelle Latimer makes her feature doc debut with a powerfully cinematic, observational doc that captures the realities of five Toronto rappers trying to escape the hustle of drugs and danger through their music."

Reception 

The film received positive reviews, was nominated for several awards, including for a Canadian Screen Award, and screened at numerous festivals, notably the Hot Docs Film Festival.

References

External links
 

2013 films
2013 documentary films
Canadian documentary films
Documentary films about hip hop music and musicians
Documentary films about Toronto
Canadian hip hop films
Music of Toronto
Films directed by Michelle Latimer
2010s English-language films
2010s Canadian films